is a Japanese instructor of Shotokan karate. He has won the JKA All-Japan championships for kumite on 2 occasions. He is currently an instructor of the Japan Karate Association.

Biography
Shimizu was born in Kyoto, Japan. He studied at Kyoto Industrial University. His karate training began during his 1st year of elementary school.

Competition
Shimizu has had considerable success in karate competitions.

Major tournament successes
 54th JKA All Japan Karate Championship (2011) – 3rd Place Kumite
 53rd JKA All Japan Karate Championship (2010) – 2nd Place Kumite
 52nd JKA All Japan Karate Championship (2009) – 3rd Place Kumite
 51st JKA All Japan Karate Championship (2008) – 1st Place Kumite
 49th JKA All Japan Karate Championship (2006) – 1st Place Kumite
 48th JKA All Japan Karate Championship (2005) – 2nd Place Kumite
 44th JKA All Japan Karate Championship (2001) – 3rd Place Kumite

References

Living people
1980 births
Japanese male karateka
Karate coaches
Shotokan practitioners
Sportspeople from Kyoto
Asian Games silver medalists for Japan
Asian Games medalists in karate
Karateka at the 2006 Asian Games
World Games bronze medalists
Medalists at the 2006 Asian Games
Competitors at the 2001 World Games
World Games medalists in karate